Oversea-Chinese Banking Corporation, Limited, often known as OCBC Bank, is a Singaporean multinational banking and financial services corporation headquartered in OCBC Centre, Singapore. OCBC Bank was born out of the Great Depression through the consolidation of three banks in 1932 — the Chinese Commercial Bank Limited (incorporated in 1912), the Ho Hong Bank Limited (incorporated in 1917) and the Oversea-Chinese Bank Limited (incorporated in 1919).

OCBC Bank has assets of more than S$521.3 billion, making it the second largest bank in Southeast Asia by assets and among the larger banks in Asia-Pacific. It is also one of the world’s most highly-rated banks, with an Aa1 rating from Moody’s and AA- rating from Standard & Poor's.

OCBC Bank is consistently ranked amongst the top five "safest banks in the world" by the magazine Global Finance. The Asian Banker named OCBC Bank Singapore's strongest bank for 2018-2019, and the 5th strongest in Asia-Pacific. The bank's global network has grown to comprise more than 570 branches and representative offices in 18 countries and regions. These include over 320 branches and offices in Indonesia under subsidiary Bank OCBC NISP, and more than 100 branches and offices in Hong Kong, China and Macao under OCBC Wing Hang Bank. OCBC Bank was awarded World's Best Bank (Asia-Pacific) in 2019 by Global Finance Magazine.

History 

On 31 October 1932, three banks – Chinese Commercial Bank (1912), Ho Hong Bank (1917), and Oversea-Chinese Bank (1919), merged to form Oversea-Chinese Banking Corporation under the leadership of Hoklos Tan Ean Kiam and Lee Kong Chian. In the subsequent decades, the bank expanded its operations and became the largest bank in South East Asia.

In 1942 during World War II, all the local banks in Singapore closed briefly during the early days of the Japanese Occupation. By April 1942 most banks, including OCBC, had resumed normal operations. In Indonesia, the Japanese occupation authorities closed OCBC's branches in Sumatra. During the war, the bank moved its head office to Bombay, India and only re-registered back in Singapore after the war ended. OCBC's branch in Xiamen survived the war and in the 1950s, OCBC was one of only four foreign banks to have branches in China.

After the war, OCBC re-established its branches in Jambi, Jakarta, and Surabaya. However, the 1963 conflict between Indonesia and Malaysia (which then included Singapore) resulted in the closure of OCBC's branches there. That same year the revolutionary government in Burma nationalized OCBC's two branches there, which became People's Bank No. 14.

The bank was criticized for not expanding fast enough to meet the needs of the post-war Chinese business community, especially in the smaller towns of Malaya. One of the critics was Tan Sri Khoo Teck Puat, who subsequently resigned to set up Malayan Banking. By 1970, OCBC's total assets exceeded 1 billion SGD, making OCBC the largest financial institution with the biggest deposit base in Singapore.

In 1972, OCBC acquired Four Seas Communications Bank, the oldest surviving Chinese bank in Singapore. The bank had been founded in 1906 as the Sze Hai Tong Bank and its founders had targeted the Teochew community.

On 9 May 1989, OCBC took on a new corporate identity by changing its logo and its name to OCBC Bank.

The bank had branches in Hong Kong and in Bangkok, where it had become the first Chinese bank there when it opened its branch in 1909.

The next major acquisition occurred in 2001, when OCBC Bank acquired Keppel Capital Holdings and all its subsidiaries, including Keppel TatLee Bank, Keppel Securities, and Keppel TatLee Finance. The next year OCBC operationally and legally integrated Keppel TatLee Bank. In 2003 OCBC merged OCBC Finance into OCBC Bank.

The official opening of e2 Power's Cyberjaya Office occurred in 2004. The same year saw the unofficial opening of OCBC Bank's new corporate HQ in Kuala Lumpur, and announced merger of asset management operations of OAM with Straits Lion Asset Management. OCBC opened an off-shore branch in Brunei.

2007: Commencement of business of OCBC China Bank.
2008: Acquired 67% shareholding in PacificMas Berhad.

In March 2020, OCBC announced its partnership with Xero, a New Zealand-based cloud accounting software, to help clients digitize their operations.

In July 2020, OCBC launched HealthPass, a healthcare mobile application that aims to connect patients with medical doctors in Singapore via online consultation.

In November 2022, the Dubai Financial Services Authority (financial regulator in Dubai) imposed a US$1.12 million fine on the Dubai International Financial Centre (DIFC) branch of Bank of Singapore (BOS) - a wholly-owned subsidiary of OCBC - for a number of contraventions, such as inadequate systems and controls, and shortfalls relating to anti-money laundering.

Shareholders
The ten largest shareholders as of 8 March 2021 are:

* Percentage is calculated based on the total number of issued ordinary shares, excluding treasury shares.

Subsidiaries

OCBC Securities
OCBC Securities Private Limited is a wholly owned subsidiary of OCBC Bank, and is a member of the Singapore Exchange Securities Trading Limited (SGX-ST) and the Singapore Exchange Derivatives Trading Limited (SGX-DT). It was established in 1986.

Great Eastern Holdings 

In 2004, OCBC acquired Great Eastern Holdings (GEH) following a voluntary cash offer. GEH had $53.1 billion in assets and 3.8 million policyholders as at 30 September 2010. GEH operates two distribution channels – the tied agency force and bancassurance. The company also operates in China, Malaysia, Indonesia and Brunei.

Lion Global Investors (LGI) 
OCBC launched LGI in September 2005 following the merger of the asset management arms of OCBC Bank and Great Eastern Holdings. Lion Global Investors had total assets under management of about S$29.4 billion as at 30 September 2010.

Bank of Singapore
Bank of Singapore, (formerly ING Asia Private Bank), is a wholly owned private banking subsidiary of OCBC Bank. With a branch in Hong Kong and offices in Manila and Dubai, Bank of Singapore serves high-net-worth individuals and wealthy families of China, Europe, Hong Kong, Indonesia, Japan, Korea, Malaysia, the Middle East, the Philippines, Singapore, Taiwan, and Thailand, as well as global Non-Resident Indians. OCBC acquired ING Asia Private Bank on 29 January 2010 and renamed it Bank of Singapore.

Singapore Island Bank 
Singapore Island Bank Limited is a full-licensed bank and a wholly owned subsidiary of OCBC Bank. Singapore Island Bank has S$100 million in capital, and is governed under the Banking Laws and Regulation in Singapore. It houses finatiQ, which operates as an Internet bank.

Singapore Island Bank was formerly known as Bank of Singapore, and OCBC acquired it in 2000. On 29 January 2010, OCBC Bank completed its acquisition of ING Asia Private Bank and renamed it Bank of Singapore. OCBC renamed the bank that housed finatiQ, Singapore Island Bank to differentiate these two separate businesses to avoid confusion.

Bank OCBC NISP 

In 2004, OCBC Bank acquired a 22.5% stake in PT Bank NISP Tbk ("Bank NISP"), its joint-venture partner in PT OCBC Indonesia since 1996. With the completion of this transaction, Bank NISP became an associate company of OCBC Bank. Bank NISP was ranked the 11th largest Indonesian bank by assets and had a network of 135 branches and offices and, over 3,000 shared ATMs.

In the same year, OCBC Bank purchased an additional 28.5% stake in Bank NISP, raising its shareholding in Bank NISP to 51%. OCBC Bank subsequently raised its stake to 70.62% in 2005. By 2008, it had increased its stake in Bank NISP to 74.73%. In 2008, Bank NISP changed its name to Bank OCBC NISP.

As of 30 September 2010, Bank OCBC NISP had 5,995 employees, total assets of Rp 40.2 trillion, and served customers through a network of 411 offices in 62 cities and 576 ATMs throughout Indonesia. Its customers could also use more than 37,500 ATMs (including ATMs belonging to ATM Bersama, Bank Central Asia, OCBC Bank in Singapore, and BankCard in Malaysia). Subsequently, in November 2010, OCBC Indonesia merged with OCBC NISP.

OCBC Al-Amin Bank Berhad
OCBC wholly owns OCBC Al-Amin Bank, which offers Islamic banking products and services in Malaysia. OCBC had offered Islamic banking products and services since 1995. Finally, on 1 December 2008 OCBC launched OCBC Al-Amin Bank Berhad. OCBC Al-Amin offers products and services based on the applicable Shariah contract and with the endorsement of the Shariah Advisory Committee.

OCBC Bank (China)
OCBC China has 17 branches on the mainland and in Hong Kong. OCBC's presence in China dates back to 1925 when it opened a branch in Xiamen. In 2007 OCBC established its wholly owned subsidiary with headquarters in Shanghai.

OCBC Wing Hang Bank

In March 2014, OCBC Bank offered to pay nearly US$5 Billion for Wing Hang Bank, one of Hong Kong's last family-owned banks. Wing Hang was the eighth-largest lender in Hong Kong. Under the Hong Kong Companies Ordinance, OCBC Bank, with 97.52 percent of Wing Hang's shares, compulsorily acquired Wing Hang on 29 July 2014.

On 1 October 2014, Wing Hang Bank was rebranded as OCBC Wing Hang Bank to reflect its integration into the OCBC family.

Select Securities Limited (Hong Kong)
In November 1960, OCBC established an investment holding company named as Select Securities Limited. The company is based in Hong Kong. Select Securities Limited operates as a subsidiary of Oversea-Chinese Banking Corp. Ltd.

Equity investment

Ningbo Commercial Bank
In 2006 the bank acquired a 12.2% stake in China's Bank of Ningbo.

Citations and references
Citations

References
 Turnell, Sean (2009) Fiery Dragons: Banks, Moneylenders and Microfinnance in Burma. (NAIS Press).

External links 

 OCBC Group

 
Banks of Singapore
Banks of Hong Kong
Banks established in 1932
Companies listed on the Singapore Exchange
Multinational companies headquartered in Singapore
Online brokerages
Singaporean brands
1932 establishments in Singapore